The Pucikwar language, A-Pucikwar, is an extinct language of the Andaman Islands, India, formerly spoken by the Pucikwar people on the south coast of Middle Andaman, the northeast coast of South Andaman, and on Baratang Island.  It belonged to the Great Andamanese family.

History
As the colonization and settlement process of the Andaman Islands intensified from the late 19th century and into the 20th century, the indigenous Great Andamanese groups were greatly reduced in number and became alienated from their traditional territories. The few surviving Great Andamanese soon lost the cultural and linguistic distinctions among them that were present at the onset of the 19th century, when at least ten distinct tribal and linguistic groups were recorded.
By the 1901 census, the Pucikwar were reduced to 50, but distinctions between tribal groups and subgroups had become considerably blurred (and some intermarriage had also occurred with Indian and Karen (Burmese) settlers).  
The Pucikwar tribe disappeared as a distinct group sometime after 1931.

Grammar
The Great Andamanese languages are agglutinative languages, with an extensive prefix and suffix system.  They have a distinctive noun class system based largely on body parts, in which every noun and adjective may take a prefix according to which body part it is associated with (on the basis of shape, or functional association). Thus, for instance, the *aka- at the beginning of the language names is a prefix for objects related to the tongue.  An adjectival example can be given by the various forms of yop, "pliable, soft", in Aka-Bea: 
A cushion or sponge is ot-yop "round-soft", from the prefix attached to words relating to the head or heart.
A cane is ôto-yop, "pliable", from a prefix for long things.
A stick or pencil is aka-yop, "pointed", from the tongue prefix.
A fallen tree is ar-yop, "rotten", from the prefix for limbs or upright things.
Similarly, beri-nga "good" yields:
un-bēri-ŋa "clever" (hand-good).
ig-bēri-ŋa "sharp-sighted" (eye-good).
aka-bēri-ŋa "good at languages" (tongue-good.)
ot-bēri-ŋa "virtuous" (head/heart-good)

The prefixes are,

Body parts are inalienably possessed, requiring a possessive adjective prefix to complete them, so one cannot say "head" alone, but only "my, or his, or your, etc. head".

The basic pronouns are almost identical throughout the Great Andamanese languages; Aka-Bea will serve as a representative example (pronouns given in their basic prefixal forms):

'This' and 'that' are distinguished as k- and t-.

Judging from the available sources, the Andamanese languages have only two cardinal numbers — one and two — and their entire numerical lexicon is one, two, one more, some more, and all.

See also
Andamanese languages

References

Great Andamanese languages
Languages of India
Extinct languages of Asia
Agglutinative languages
Languages extinct in the 20th century